Pachnistis phaeoptila is a moth in the family Autostichidae. It was described by John David Bradley in 1961 and is found in Java, Indonesia.

References

Moths described in 1961
Pachnistis